Ida Erios Nantaba is a Ugandan politician. She was the State Minister in the Uganda Ministry of Information and Communications Technology. She was appointed to that position on 6 June 2016. Prior to that, from 15 August 2012 until 6 June 2016, she was Minister of State for Lands in the Cabinet of Uganda. Nantaba is also the elected Member of Parliament for Women  in Kayunga District Constituency.

Background and education
She was born in Kayunga District on 20 December 1979. Her father had died in 1984 and she was left with her mother who took care of her with support from her elder brother (Samuel Kabenge Bamulumbye) the heir of her father. She attended Ndeeba Primary School in Kayunga District from 1986 to 1992, where she finished her Primary Leaving Examinations. However, her mother and elder brother did not have money enough to take her to a very good secondary school so she joined Ndeeba Senior Secondary School for her S1 in 1993. She also moved to stay with the elder brother in Kisoga village, still in Kayunga District. In 1994, Nantaba's mother acquired some money, and Nantaba was moved from Ndeeba SSS to Katikamu SDA SSS where she studied from Senior 2 to Senior 4 (Uganda Certificate of Education). She was admitted at Mukono Town Academy for her A' Level which she completed in November 1998. On 26 September 1999, Nantaba was admitted to Makerere University, for a bachelor's degree in tourism. She undertook an undergraduate student research project, "Medicinal Plants As Tourism Potential: Case Study of Uganda Wildlife Educational Center (UWEC)", which was supervised by Professor J. B. Nyakaana. Nantaba has a Bachelor of Tourism degree, obtained in 2003 from Makerere University.

Career

2003–2015
In 2003, following her graduation from Makerere, she worked as a tourism officer with Pearl of Africa Tours and Travel Limited. She left that job in late 2003. Beginning in 2005, she served on the board of directors of Jordan Laboratories Limited, a distributor of photographic and printing equipment. In 2010, she joined active elective politics by contesting the Kayunga District Women's Parliamentary Constituency. She won the NRM political party primary by defeating the incumbent, Florence Naiga. In 2011, she was elected during the general election. In a cabinet reshuffle on 15 August 2012, she was appointed as State Minister for Lands, replacing Sarah Opendi Achieng. After weeks of protracted confirmation hearings, the Appointments Committee of Parliament finally confirmed her appointment on 23 October 2012.

2015–present
During the 2016 parliamentary election cycle, Nantaba lost during the primary elections held by the National Resistance Movement (NRM), her political party at the time. She quit the party, citing rigging during the primaries, as she had previously warned. During the national elections held on 18 February 2016, Nantaba, who ran as an independent candidate, polled 86,057 votes against Ruth Nakacwa, who received 13,184 votes. Despite having quit the ruling NRM party, she was appointed as Minister of State for ICT on 6 June 2016.

On 24 March 2019, Nantaba was involved in an incident that led to an innocent person being handcuffed and shot dead by Ugandan police. Nantaba had wrongly thought the man, Ronald Ssebulime, had been following them on his motorcycle in Kayunga District. After a pursuit, Ssebulime was arrested, handcuffed, and shot twice in the chest by an officer. Officials initially tried to cover up the incident, saying they had thwarted an assassination attempt. But after civic outrage, the police released a statement holding the officer responsible.

Other responsibilities
Aidah Nantaba is single. She is of the Seventh-day Adventist faith. She sits in the 10th Parliament (2016–2021) as an Independent. She serves on the following additional committees in parliament:
 
 Committee on Tourism, Trade and Industry
 Committee on HIV/AIDS and Related Matters

See also 
 Kayunga District
 Parliament of Uganda
 List of members of the tenth Parliament of Uganda

References

External links
 Website of the Parliament of Uganda
Photo of Aidah Nantaba In 2012

Living people
1979 births
Makerere University alumni
Government ministers of Uganda
Ganda people
Independent politicians in Uganda
People from Kayunga District
Members of the Parliament of Uganda
21st-century Ugandan women politicians
21st-century Ugandan politicians
Women government ministers of Uganda
Women members of the Parliament of Uganda